The 2009 Spengler Cup was held in Davos, Switzerland, from December 26 to December 31, 2009. All matches were played at host HC Davos' home Vaillant Arena. The tournament featured all of the last year's tournament participants except for last year's winners Dynamo Moscow who was replaced by HC Dinamo Minsk and ERC Ingolstadt who was replaced by Adler Mannheim.

Teams participating
 Team Canada
 HC Davos (host)
 Adler Mannheim
 HC Energie Karlovy Vary
 HC Dinamo Minsk

Tournament

Round-robin results

All times local (CET/UTC +1)

Final

All times are local (UTC+1).

Champions

All-Star Team

Statistics

Scoring leaders

'' G = Goals; A = Assists; Pts = Points

Television
Several television channels around the world will cover many or all matches of the Spengler Cup. As well as most Swiss channels, here is a listing of who else will cover the tournament:

Schweizer Fernsehen (Switzerland, host broadcaster)
The Sports Network (Canada)
Eurosport 2, British Eurosport, Eurosport Asia and Pacific, and Eurosport HD
Nova Sport (Czech Republic, Slovakia)

References

2009–10
2009–10 in Swiss ice hockey
2009–10 in German ice hockey
2009–10 in Canadian ice hockey
2009–10 in Czech ice hockey
December 2009 sports events in Europe